Serednie is an urban-type settlement in Uzhhorod Raion (district) of Zakarpattia Oblast (province) in western Ukraine. The town's population was 3,505 as of the 2001 Ukrainian Census. Current population: . Geographically, Serednie is located exactly between the cities of Uzhhorod, the district's administrative center, and Mukacheve.

The village houses the remains of a Romanesque castle.  The village itself was first mentioned in the 14th century, although archaeologists have dated the castle back to the 12th century. The castle is said to have been built by the Knights Templar.

References

External links
 

Urban-type settlements in Uzhhorod Raion
Populated places established in the 14th century